Who Paid the Piper? The CIA and the Cultural Cold War (U.S. title The Cultural Cold War: The CIA and the World of Arts and Letters) is a 1999 book by Frances Stonor Saunders. The book discusses the mid-20th century Central Intelligence Agency efforts to infiltrate and co-opt artistic movements using funds that were mostly channelled through the Congress for Cultural Freedom and the Ford Foundation. The aim of these efforts was to combat the political influence of the Soviet Union and expand American political influence. Saunders concluded that by entangling the state in "free" artistic expression, the CIA undermined America's moral position in comparison to the Soviet Union. In Dissent Jeffrey C. Isaac wrote that the book is a "widely discussed retrospective on post-Second World War liberalism that raises important questions about the relationships between intellectuals and political power."

The British edition, titled Who Paid the Piper? The CIA and the Cultural Cold War, was published in 1999 by Granta Books (London). The American edition, titled The Cultural Cold War: The CIA and the World of Arts and Letters, was published in 2000 by The New Press. Josef Joffe, in a book review written for The New York Times, described the American title as being "more neutral". Paul Roazen, in The Sewanee Review, described the British title as being "more provocative".

Saunders concluded that the activities of the U.S. were similar to those of the Soviet Union.

Content
Saunders writes that the CIA secretly subsidised the European tours of the Boston Symphony Orchestra and the films 1984 and Animal Farm. It paid for the publication of thousands of books, including by the publisher Frederick A. Praeger and Yugoslav dissident Milovan Djilas. It financed the Partisan Review and The Kenyon Review. Saunders focuses on the creation, activities, and downfalls of the Congress for Cultural Freedom and its the journal Encounter. The book describes how the CIA set up fake foundations and used established bodies such as the Ford Foundation and the Rockefeller Foundation, to hide its funding of the Congress for Cultural Freedom and its other covert activities.

Reception
The book received media attention after its publication and The New York Times, Organization of American Historians 2000, Arthur Schlesinger Jr., and other former CCF participants focused attention on the book after its American release. Left-wing publications such as Monthly Review and The Nation gave the book a positive reception, while right-wing publications such as The American Spectator and National Interest gave the book a negative reception. The book won the Guardian First Book Award.

Edward Said wrote that the book is "a major work of investigative history, an extremely valuable contribution to the all-important post-World War Two record" and that "the gist of her argument about Abstract Expressionism and its uses as propaganda is correct, if not wholly original". He said that "[t]he dispiriting truth it reveals, or confirms, is that few of 'our' major intellectual and cultural figures resisted the blandishments of the CIA". He added that some of the information in the book is not "complete" or "fully accurate", in particular the chapter discussing the CIA infiltrating organisations.

The Baumols concluded that the book has a lot of detail which is not necessary for Saunders' arguments and repetition that "gives the reader a sense of wallowing through a dense landscape, looking for the fascinating nuggets of history that are certainly there." The Baumols argued that, based on the contents of the book, the CIA had a "surprisingly benign" impact, in contradiction with what they believed Saunders would conclude, and that the book "suggests that [the CIA's] role in the arts was considerably less damaging than might reasonably have been feared."

Paul Buhle of Brown University described Who Paid the Piper? as being the "most spectacular" book recently released about the involvement of CIA and intellectuals; Buhle stated that compared to Freiheit in der Offensive? by Michael Hochgeschwender, Who Paid the Piper? has fewer footnotes but more "charisma" and "verve".

Gow wrote that even though the author had a negative attitude towards the CIA activities, the book has a "triumph" since "she shows men like [CIA employee Tom Braden, who headed the program] to have been unsung heroes of the Cold War, as well as masters of art in both cultural warfare and cultural appreciation."

Jeffrey C. Isaac criticized the book, saying that it was "shrill" and with a "prosecutorial tone," that it had arguments without "nuance," that it did not "grapple in a serious way with the ideas that were the chief currency of those it purports to study", and that it did not consider the importance and the need to secure "liberal values and institutions".

Jeremy Isaacs in The Spectator wrote that the book has portions that are humorous, citing reactions to figures who learned that they were subsidised by the CIA. He concluded that it was a "hammer-blow of a book".

Joffe criticised the book for equating the U.S. propaganda efforts with those from the USSR in a "a strident anti-anti-Communism that refuses to accord the Western cause the moral worth it deserves, considering the wares the totalitarians were hawking." He characterized the book as having "careless sourcing" and "ad hominem slurs".

Roazen described the book as "highly readable" and "fascinating".

Mary Carroll of Booklist described the book as having a "European point of view". William and Hilda Baumol, in their book review, wrote that Saunders "generally avoids explicit judgments, seeking to be dispassionate in her account." James Gow of King's College, London stated that Saunders had a negative tone towards the CIA activities and a "churlish attitude".

Reviewing the book for Studies in Intelligence, former CIA official historian Thomas M. Troy Jr. wrote "Saunders deserves praise for presenting opposing views" and that she did "a fine job in recounting the intriguing story of how the CIA worked with existing institutions", but added that the book "has some major shortcomings" and "contains some silly mistakes and some real gaffes". Troy stated that Saunders "repeatedly returns to the theme that the CIA injured the cause of intellectual freedom by clandestinely supporting (oh, irony of ironies!) champions of intellectual freedom." Touching on what he perceived to be the books shortcomings, he wrote "despite Saunders's assertions that the CIA undermined intellectual freedom, she does not present any examples of people whose intellectual growth was stunted or impaired because of the Agency's programs" and mentioned that she failed to substantial discuss Soviet actions during the Cold War that would have helped readers to understand those of the CIA. While taking issue with the book's content and conclusions, Troy summarized "I highly enjoyed and strongly recommend her book".

See also
 CIA and the Cultural Cold War
 Michael Josselson

References
 Baumol, William (New York University Center for Applied Economics); Baumol, Hilda (Consultants in Industry Economics, Princeton, New Jersey). "Frances Stonor Saunders (ed.): The Cultural Cold War: The CIA and the World of Arts and Letters." Journal of Cultural Economics, 2001, Vol.25(1), pp. 73–75.
 Buhle, Paul (Brown University). "The Cultural Cold War: The CIA and the World of Arts and Letters." Journal of American History, Dec, 2001, Vol.88(3), p. 1152(2).
 Carroll, Mary. "The Cultural Cold War: The CIA and the World of Arts and Letters.(Review)(Brief Article)." Booklist, April 15, 2000, Vol.96(16), p. 1505-1506.
 Draper, Roger. "Summer Books: Secrets of State" (review of The Cultural Cold War). The New Leader, May/June 2000, Vol.83(2), p. 15-16.
 Gow, James (King's College, London). "Who Paid the Piper? The CIA and the Cultural Cold War" (book review). International Affairs (Royal Institute of International Affairs 1944-). 1 October 1999,  Vol.75(4). Available at JSTOR.
 Isaac, Jeffrey C. (Indiana University). "Rethinking the cultural cold war.(The Cultural Cold War: The CIA and the World of Arts and Letters)(Book Review)." Dissent, Summer, 2002, Vol.49(3), p. 29(38)
 Isaacs, Jeremy. "The CIA and the Cultural Cold War.(Review)." The Spectator, 17 July 1999, Vol.283, p. 32(2).
 Roazen, Paul. "Literary politics in the Cold War.(The Cultural Cold War: The CIA and the World of Arts and Letters)(Book Review)" The Sewanee Review, Fall, 2002, Vol.110(4), p.cxii-cxv.

Notes

Further reading
 Romano, Carlin. "Cold-War Cultural Tactics Should Be a Hot Topic." The Chronicle of Higher Education, March 3, 2006, Vol.52(26)
 Sharlet, Jeff. "Tinker, writer, artist, spy: intellectuals during the Cold War." The Chronicle of Higher Education, March 31, 2000, Vol.46(30), p.A19(2)
 Wreszin, Michael. "The Cultural Cold War: The CIA and the World of Arts and Letters. (Review)" Reviews in American History,  Dec, 2000, Vol.28(4), p. 607-614 
 Saunders, Frances Stonor. "Modern art was CIA 'weapon'" (Archive). The Independent. Sunday 22 October 1995.

External links
 Chapter One (Archive) - Posted at The New York Times
 Presentation by Saunders at the U.S. National Archives and Records Administration, May 23, 2000

1999 non-fiction books
Non-fiction books about the Central Intelligence Agency
British books
CIA-funded propaganda
Congress for Cultural Freedom